Luis Ygnacio Liendo (born November 25, 1980 in Caracas, Distrito Capital) is an amateur Venezuelan Greco-Roman wrestler, who competes in the men's lightweight category. He won two bronze medals for the 60 kg division at the 2003 Pan American Games in Santo Domingo, Dominican Republic, and at the 2007 Pan American Games in Rio de Janeiro, Brazil. Liendo also defeated United States wrestler Joe Betterman for the gold medal in the same division at the 2011 Pan American Games in Guadalajara, Mexico, earning him a spot on the Venezuelan wrestling team for the Olympics.

At age thirty-one, Liendo made his official Olympic debut at the 2012 Summer Olympics in London, where he competed in the men's 60 kg class. He received a bye for the preliminary round of sixteen match, before losing out to Kazakhstan's Almat Kebispayev, with a three-set technical score (0–1, 2–0, 0–2), and a classification point score of 1–3.

References

External links
 Profile – International Wrestling Database
 NBC Olympics Profile

1980 births
Living people
Olympic wrestlers of Venezuela
Wrestlers at the 2012 Summer Olympics
Wrestlers at the 2003 Pan American Games
Wrestlers at the 2007 Pan American Games
Wrestlers at the 2011 Pan American Games
Pan American Games gold medalists for Venezuela
Pan American Games silver medalists for Venezuela
Pan American Games bronze medalists for Venezuela
Sportspeople from Caracas
Venezuelan male sport wrestlers
Pan American Games medalists in wrestling
South American Games gold medalists for Venezuela
South American Games medalists in wrestling
Competitors at the 2014 South American Games
Medalists at the 2003 Pan American Games
Medalists at the 2007 Pan American Games
Medalists at the 2011 Pan American Games
20th-century Venezuelan people
21st-century Venezuelan people